Kostas Kyriacou (born 10 June 1958), also known as "Outopos", is a Cypriot farmer and perennial candidate. He studied Medicine at the Aristotelian University of Thessaloniki, resides in Paphos, and is divorced with three children.

Presidential campaign and views
Kostas Kyriacou became famous in Cyprus because since 1998, he has been a candidate for every election, from presidential to parliamentary elections that take place in Cyprus. However, he has never gained more than 1% of the vote.

He has often accused politicians and the authorities of stealing his votes and giving them to the main candidates. For example, he claims that in presidential elections of 2003, he gained 73.4% of the vote, but his share was split between Tassos Papadopoulos and Glafkos Klerides; he never gave reliable evidence for his accusations.
In the official results for presidential elections of 2003 he only received 0.44% of the votes. During presidential elections of 2008, he only gained 0.24% votes.

Kostas Kyriacou views are to create four city-states in Cyprus: three for Greek Cypriots and one for Turkish Cypriots. He says he would reconstruct all the cities on the island, and will give emphasis on people's health. Also, weddings would be forbidden on the island, while men and women will be able to make love freely with no need for engagements.

During election for the European Parliament in 2009, his view expanded to "a New Earth, an Earth which can include the land of the apocalypse, an Earth without mountains, an endless valley which can feed and nourish 57 billion".

As a part of his next moves, it will be gaining the position of the Secretary General of the United Nations, through which he can promote his ultimate goal. That goal is a world government with a unique world language and culture.

References

External links
 Κινημα για εναν Καλυτερο Κοσμο (Ουτοπια)

1958 births
Living people
Greek Cypriot politicians